USS Lenapee was a steamer acquired by the Union Navy during the American Civil War. She was used by the Navy as a tugboat.

Service history
Lenapee, a wooden double-ended sidewheel gunboat, was launched 28 May 1863 by Edward Lupton, Brooklyn, New York; and commissioned 30 December 1864, Lt. Comdr. Samuel Magaw in command. Lenapee joined the North Atlantic Blockading Squadron at Beaufort, North Carolina, 23 January 1865 and was ordered to Cape Fear River for final operations against Wilmington, North Carolina. In the weeks that followed she did reconnaissance and patrol work while Rear Admiral David Dixon Porter and Major General Terry marshaled their forces for an attack on Fort Anderson.

On 7 February, as Brigadier General John M. Schofield advanced from Smithville with 8,000 men, Porter attacked Fort Anderson by water. Lenapee, and  shelled the defensive works. The next day the Union ships moved in closer and kept up a heavy fire until the dogged Confederate defenders were at last forced to evacuate the fort under cover of darkness. After Wilmington had fallen 22 February, Lenapee was one of three ships ordered to remain in the Cape Fear River to defend the town and to help clear the navigable waters around Wilmington of obstructions. There she served until after the end of the Civil War, retained at Wilmington through 1866 as protection against civil riots. Lenapee decommissioned 17 October 1867 and was sold at Portsmouth, New Hampshire, to E. Stannard 26 August 1868.

References 

Ships of the Union Navy
Ships built in Brooklyn
Steamships of the United States Navy
1863 ships
Sassacus-class gunboats